Charles Robert Brewer (born April 7, 1988) is an American former professional baseball pitcher who played in Major League Baseball (MLB) for the Arizona Diamondbacks during the 2013 and 2014 seasons, and for the Cleveland Indians during the 2015 season.

Career

Amateur
Brewer attended the University of California, Los Angeles (UCLA), where he played college baseball for the UCLA Bruins baseball team. In 2007 and 2008, he played collegiate summer baseball with the Chatham A's of the Cape Cod Baseball League.

Arizona Diamondbacks
The Diamondbacks selected Brewer in the 12th round of the 2009 MLB Draft. He made his MLB debut on June 10, 2013.

Cleveland Indians
The Diamondbacks traded Brewer to the Cleveland Indians for cash considerations on November 22, 2014.

Seattle Mariners
He was released by the Seattle Mariners in March 2016.

Second Stint with Diamondbacks
On April 28, 2016, Brewer signed a minor league deal with the Arizona Diamondbacks. He elected free agency on November 2, 2016.

Bridgeport Bluefish
On April 4, 2017, Brewer signed with the Bridgeport Bluefish of the Atlantic League of Professional Baseball.

Southern Maryland Blue Crabs
On November 1, 2017, Brewer was drafted by the Southern Maryland Blue Crabs in the Bridgeport Bluefish dispersal draft.

Sugar Land Skeeters
On January 9, 2018, Brewer was traded to the Sugar Land Skeeters where he finished his playing career.

Personal life
He is the older brother of ESPN reporter Ashley Brewer.

References

External links

 

Living people
1988 births
People from Paradise Valley, Arizona
Sportspeople from the Phoenix metropolitan area
Baseball players from Arizona
Arizona Diamondbacks players
Missoula Osprey players
UCLA Bruins baseball players
Chatham Anglers players
South Bend Silver Hawks players
Visalia Rawhide players
Mobile BayBears players
Arizona League Diamondbacks players
Reno Aces players
Salt River Rafters players
Major League Baseball pitchers
Arizona League Indians players
Akron RubberDucks players
Bridgeport Bluefish players